Karl Gunnar Larsson (born 12 May 1951) is a former swimmer from Sweden. He won the 400 metre individual medley event at the 1972 Summer Olympics by two one-thousandths (0.002) of a second over American Tim McKee, breaking the Olympic record.  The controversy over the accuracy of such timing was the reason the international swimming rules were subsequently changed, and today swimming times are measured in hundredths of a second.

He also won the 200 metre individual medley event at the same Olympic Games, setting the new world record. Two years earlier, Larsson received the Svenska Dagbladet Gold Medal due to his swimming at the 1970 European championships where he won three gold (200 metre medley, 400 metre medley and 400 metre freestyle) and one silver (200 m freestyle). A year later, 1973, Larsson won the 200 metre individual medley at the first official FINA World Championships in Belgrade.

During his career, Larsson set three world and eight European records. Together with Arne Borg he is considered as Sweden's greatest swimmer of all time. In 1979, he was inducted in the International Swimming Hall of Fame.

Larsson retired from competitive swimming in 1973 and until 1980 worked as a swimming coach. Later he took miscellaneous jobs, mostly with McDonald's and the Swedish Swimming Federation (2000–2005); he also did one year of acting in 2003. Between 1974 and 2004 he worked as part-time swimming commentator with radio stations.

His mother died in 1960 when he was only 9 years old. In 1979, he married Marianne Larsson. They have three children: Lotten (b. 1978), Emelie (b. 1980) and Amanda (b. 1989). His elder sisters, Karin and Kristina, are also former Olympic swimmers.

See also
 List of members of the International Swimming Hall of Fame
 List of Olympic medalists in swimming (men)
 World record progression 400 metres freestyle

References

1951 births
Living people
Swedish male freestyle swimmers
Swimmers at the 1968 Summer Olympics
Swimmers at the 1972 Summer Olympics
Olympic swimmers of Sweden
Olympic gold medalists for Sweden
Sportspeople from Malmö
World record setters in swimming
World Aquatics Championships medalists in swimming
European Aquatics Championships medalists in swimming
Medalists at the 1972 Summer Olympics
Olympic gold medalists in swimming
Malmö SS swimmers
SK Ran swimmers
Swedish male medley swimmers